The 2014–15 Arkansas State Red Wolves men's basketball team represented Arkansas State University during the 2014–15 NCAA Division I men's basketball season. The Red Wolves, led by seventh year head coach John Brady, played their home games at the Convocation Center, and were members of the Sun Belt Conference. They finished the season 11–18, 6–14 in Sun Belt play to finish in tenth place. They failed to qualify for the Sun Belt tournament.

Roster

Schedule

|-
!colspan=9 style="background:#cc092f; color:#FFFFFF;"| Exhibition
 

|-
!colspan=9 style="background:#cc092f; color:#FFFFFF;"| Regular season

References

Arkansas State Red Wolves men's basketball seasons
Arkansas State